Richard Caswell Saufley (1 September 1884 – 9 June 1916), was a pioneer of naval aviation in the United States Navy.

Career 
Saufley was born on 1 September 1884 at Stanford, Kentucky. He graduated from the United States Naval Academy in June 1908 and was commissioned as an ensign in June 1910. He served aboard the battleship , the torpedo boat , and the destroyer  before reporting to the Naval Aviation Camp on the grounds of the Naval Academy in Annapolis, Maryland, for training in aviation in 1913. On 6 June of that year, he was promoted to Lieutenant, junior grade, and designated Naval Aviator No. 14.

During the Veracruz campaign of 1914 in Mexico, Saufley was attached to the battleship  and the armored cruiser .

In 1915 and 1916, Saufleys assignments were concerned with the technological development of naval aviation. Concentrating on "hydro-aeroplane" (seaplane) development, he set altitude and endurance records and was attempting to better his own record when he died in a plane crash on Santa Rosa Island on a flight out of the Naval Aeronautic Station at Pensacola, Florida on 9 June 1916. His Curtiss Model E hydroplane, AH-8, went down at the 8-hour-51-minute mark of the flight. The Aeronautic Stations commandant, Commander Henry C. Mustin, later faced accusations that his "wrong flying instruction methods" had caused the deaths of Saufley and another aviator, Lieutenant, junior grade, James V. Rockwell.

Saufley is buried at Stanford Cemetery in Stanford, Kentucky.

Commemoration 
Naval Air Station Pensacolas Saufley Field and the U.S. Navy destroyer  have been named in Saufleys honor.

References

External links 
 
 history.navy.mil: USS Saufley
 The Filson Historical Quarterly biography

See also 
 List of accidents and incidents involving military aircraft (pre-1925)

1884 births
1916 deaths
United States Navy officers
United States Naval Academy alumni
United States Naval Aviators
Aviation pioneers
People from Stanford, Kentucky